The Indian Police Medal (IPM) was an award of the British Raj presented to both European and Asian police personnel. Established in 1932, the award was presented for meritorious service and gallantry that was of a lesser degree than what was required for the King's Police Medal.

History
It was decided that further recognition was required for the members of the police forces within India. Already eligible for the King's Police Medal, there were many acts of service and bravery notable enough for recognition, but not meeting the requirements of the King's Police Medal. On 23 February 1932, a royal warrant was promulgated establishing the Indian Police Medal. The medal was meant to recognize both acts of meritorious and noteworthy service, as well as gallantry. The medal was limited to 200 annual awards. A royal warrant in 1942 allowed the Viceroy of India, in exceptional circumstances, to raise the number of awards to 250 in a year. The Indian Police Medal ceased to be awarded after India became a republic. The Indian Police medal was replaced by the Police Medal which was established by the Government of India notification dated 15 March 1951.

Appearance
The Indian Police Medal is round and made of bronze. The obverse bears the effigy of the reigning monarch. The reverse of the medal depicts a wreath around the edge, surmounted by a crown. In the middle are the words FOR GALLANTRY or FOR MERITORIOUS SERVICE depending on the conditions under which the medal was awarded. The first version of the medal bore the inscription FOR DISTINGUISHED CONDUCT.

It is dark blue, with silver edges and a crimson centre stripe. For gallantry awards, the blue sections are split by a thin silver stripe.

References

Courage awards
Orders, decorations, and medals of British India
Civil awards and decorations of India
Law enforcement awards and honors
Awards established in 1932
1932 establishments in India
History of law enforcement in India
Awards disestablished in 1951
1951 disestablishments in India